Stepani ( or ) is a small settlement in the City Municipality of Koper in the Littoral region of Slovenia.

A small church in the settlement is dedicated to Saint James and belongs to the Parish of Predloka.

References

External links
Stepani on Geopedia

Populated places in the City Municipality of Koper